Comprehensive regular season results of the National Youth Competition by club.

Teams